This page provide summaries for the 1988 CFU Championship.

Qualifying tournament

First round
The following are the known matches for the first round. However, there may be more matches.

Second round

Note: these two matches were also part of the first round of the 1989 CONCACAF Championship qualification. 

 vs  was another 2nd round fixture, Guadeloupe won but the result(s) were unknown.

Finals
The final stage was hosted in Martinique.

The last match between Martinique and Trinidad/Tobago was abandoned at half time due to power failure; scoreline declared final.

References
RSSSF archives

Caribbean Cup
CFU
1988 in Martinique